is a railway station in the city of Toyokawa, Aichi Prefecture, Japan, operated by Central Japan Railway Company (JR Tōkai).

Lines
Nagayama Station is served by the Iida Line, and is located 14.4 kilometers from the southern terminus of the line at Toyohashi Station.

Station layout
The station has two opposed side platforms connected by a level crossing. The station building has automated ticket machines, TOICA automated turnstiles and is unattended.

Platforms

Adjacent stations

|-
!colspan=5|Central Japan Railway Company

Station history
Nagayama Station was established on October 19, 1898 as a station on the now-defunct . On August 1, 1943, the Toyokawa Railway was nationalized, along with some other local lines to form the Japanese Government Railways (JGR) Iida Line.  Scheduled freight operations were discontinued in 1962 and small parcel operations from 1971. The station has been unattended since February 1984. Along with its division and privatization of JNR on April 1, 1987, the station came under the control and operation of the Central Japan Railway Company. (JR Tōkai).  A new station building was completed in January 2002.

Passenger statistics
In fiscal 2017, the station was used by an average of 205 passengers daily.

Surrounding area
Toyokawa River
 Ichinomiya Tobu Elementary School

See also
 List of Railway Stations in Japan

References

External links

Railway stations in Japan opened in 1898
Railway stations in Aichi Prefecture
Iida Line
Stations of Central Japan Railway Company
Toyokawa, Aichi